125 Broad Street (formerly known as 2 New York Plaza) is an office building in the Financial District of Manhattan in New York City, at the intersection of Broad Street and South Street near South Ferry. The building was designed by the Kahn & Jacobs architecture firm, and developed by Sol Atlas and John P. McGrath.

Construction took place from 1970 to 1971. The building is to the east of 1 New York Plaza, and to the south of 55 Water Street. It has a modern structural design, and is one of a series of modern-style buildings built in the Financial District during the 1960s and 1970s. 

Starting in 2007 the managers began incorporating energy saving renovations to meet LEED Silver standards. Building amenities include on-site management, day care, a coffee shop, shoe shine and a 50-car garage.

Tenants 
 AECOM
 American Civil Liberties Union
 AXA
 COMMAND FINANCIAL
 CNA Financial Corporation
 International AIDS Vaccine Initiative
 New York Civil Liberties Union
 Police Benevolent Association of the City of New York
 Sullivan & Cromwell LLP
 SunTrust Banks
 TMP Worldwide Advertising and Communications
 Wilson Elser Moskowitz Edelman & Dicker
 GenRE, Genstar , USAIG

References

1971 establishments in New York City
Broad Street (Manhattan)
Financial District, Manhattan
Leadership in Energy and Environmental Design basic silver certified buildings
Office buildings completed in 1971
Skyscraper office buildings in Manhattan